The 2020 Russian Artistic Gymnastics Championships was held in Penza, Russia between 28 October–8 November 2020.  There was limited participation as some gymnasts were competing at the Friendship & Solidary Competition in Tokyo and others opted not to attend due to the ongoing COVID-19 pandemic.

Medalists

Results

All-Around

Vault

Uneven Bars

Balance Beam

Floor Exercise

References

External links
  Official site

Russian Artistic Gymnastics Championships
Artistic Gymnastics Championships
Russian Artistic Gymnastics Championships
November 2020 sports events in Russia
October 2020 sports events in Russia